Mustang Memorial Field, formerly known as Mustang Stadium and then Alex G. Spanos Stadium, is an 11,075-seat multi-purpose stadium located on the campus of California Polytechnic State University (Cal Poly) in San Luis Obispo, California. It is the home field of the Cal Poly Mustangs football and soccer teams. 

The stadium was renovated largely from funding via the late Alex Spanos, a Cal Poly alumnus, American billionaire real estate developer, founder of the A. G. Spanos Companies, and then-majority owner of the Chargers of the National Football League (NFL).

History and renovation

Originally opened  in 1935, the stadium was expanded in 2006 to its current capacity and, following the completion of a $21.5-million renovation, was then renamed Alex G. Spanos Stadium in a pregame ceremony on November 18. 

The recognition and subsequent renaming for the ensuing 15 years was the result of an $8 million donation to renovate Mustang Stadium by Mr. Alex Spanos, the largest single donation in the school's history at the time. At the next season's home opener following the dedication, Cal Poly debuted a tailgating section perpendicular to the stadium's entrance along South Perimeter Road, and set a sellout record of 11,075 fans as the Mustang football team defeated Weber State 47-19.

Previous expansions to the stadium's steel east-side grandstands were completed in 1972 and 1979.

In 2013, Cal Poly replaced the south end zone rented stands with permanent aluminum stands improving handicapped access. Additionally, Cal Poly renovated the lower portion of the older east-side bleachers to add handicapped seats and improve accessibility and egress. The new south endzone stands increased capacity by 345 seats.

Artist renderings of further increasing the stadium's capacity to 25,000 were released in 2010.

Formerly natural grass, FieldTurf was installed in 2022.

In November 2022, the university announced the facility would be renamed Mustang Memorial Field Presented by Dignity Health French Hospital Medical Center, reflecting a new 10-year naming rights agreement between the college and the healthcare organization. The first official events to be held at the facility under the new name were the semifinals and championship match of the 2022 Big West Women's Soccer Tournament.

Baltimore Colts preseason training camp 
From August 4–14, the Baltimore Colts, featuring Johnny Unitas, Bubba Smith, and head coach Don Shula, spent nearly two weeks holding a preseason training camp in the stadium, with practice and scrimmages open to the public. The Colts played the San Diego Chargers in a preseason game on August 2, before heading north to visit the Oakland Raiders on August 9, in-between their stay in San Luis Obispo.

CIF Championship football games 
Five times in decades past, each when various CIF Southern Section championship high school football games featured both teams from either San Luis Obispo County or Santa Barbara County facing in head-to-head matchups, the field served as the neutral host-site location for the title games, including in 1990, when a crowd of over 9,000 fans attended and future NFL first-round draft choice Napoleon Kaufman rushed for 84 yards and compiled 30 yards receiving:

 1978 (8-Man Division): Coast Union 62, Templeton 24
 1980 (Northwestern Division): San Luis Obispo 7, Lompoc 0
 1990 (Div. VII): Lompoc 12, Arroyo Grande 7
 1995 (Div. XI): Morro Bay 51, Templeton 15
 1998 (Div. IV): Arroyo Grande 31, San Luis Obispo 14

Major League Soccer exhibitions 
Six total times since the mid-2000s renovation, the stadium hosted MLS preseason exhibition matches, sometimes drawing upwards of 4,300 fans, including in 2011 and 2012 when USMNT forward Chris Wondolowski took the field:

 February 24, 2008: San Jose Earthquakes (W, 2-1) vs. Columbus Crew and D.C. United (D, 0-0)
 February 13/15, 2009: San Jose Earthquakes (W, 3-2) vs. Seattle Sounders and vs. Houston Dynamo (W, 2-0)
 March 4, 2011: San Jose Earthquakes (W, 1-0) vs. Colorado Rapids
 February 10, 2012: San Jose Earthquakes (W, 2-1) vs. Colorado Rapids

Current tenants
Cal Poly Mustangs football, as well as the men's and women's soccer teams, play their home games at the stadium.

See also
 List of NCAA Division I FCS football stadiums
Campus memorials at Cal Poly

Gallery

References

College football venues
Soccer venues in California
Cal Poly Mustangs football venues
American football venues in California
Multi-purpose stadiums in the United States
1935 establishments in California
Sports venues completed in 1935
College soccer venues in California